The Minnesota Duluth Bulldogs are the athletic teams that represent the University of Minnesota Duluth. They were first named Bulldogs in 1933. Their colors are maroon and gold. The school competes in the NCAA's Division II and the Northern Sun Intercollegiate Conference in all sports except ice hockey. The men's team competes in the National Collegiate Hockey Conference, and the women's hockey program compete in the Western Collegiate Hockey Association.  Both hockey conferences are Division I. They are also known for having a strong club sports program, especially in ultimate frisbee, lacrosse, rugby, alpine skiing and ice hockey.

In 2008, the undefeated Bulldogs won the NCAA Division II National Football Championship—the first Division II championship in any sport at the school. On December 18, 2010, the Bulldogs won their second Division II national title in football. On April 9, 2011, the Bulldogs men's ice hockey program won its first NCAA Division I national championship, beating Michigan 3–2 in overtime. The Bulldog women's ice hockey program has won five NCAA Division I national titles.

Intercollegiate programs
The UMD Bulldogs compete in the 16 following sports:

Men's ice hockey

The Minnesota–Duluth Bulldogs men's hockey program plays at the NCAA Division I level as a member of the National Collegiate Hockey Conference. The Bulldogs play off campus in downtown Duluth, Minnesota at the new AMSOIL Arena. The team has been successful with numerous Frozen Four appearances, including a 4-overtime loss to Bowling Green in the 1984 Championship game – the longest championship game in the NCAA tournament's history, and three championships in 2011, 2018, and 2019.

Women's ice hockey

The Minnesota–Duluth Bulldogs women's hockey team also plays at the NCAA Division I level as a member of the Western Collegiate Hockey Association. The women's program has been one of the top women's teams in the nation winning 5 NCAA DI ice hockey championships, including the 2010 championship.

Softball
Minnesota–Duluth's softball team appeared in two Women's College World Series in 1970 and 1971.

National championships
 NCAA Women's Ice Hockey Championship (Division I)
 2001
 2002
 2003
 2008
 2010
 NCAA Division II National Football Championship
 2008
 2010
 NCAA Men's Ice Hockey Championship (Division I)
 2011
 2018
 2019

Facilities

 Griggs Field at James S. Malosky Stadium: Football, Soccer, Softball, Track and Field
 AMSOIL Arena (2011) (off-campus): Hockey
 Romano Gymnasium: Basketball, Volleyball
 Bulldog Park/Wade Stadium: Baseball

Non-varsity sports clubs

Rugby
UMD has fielded a college rugby team since 1975. UMD plays in USA Rugby's Division II, and in 2013 reached the DII national playoffs. UM Duluth rugby offers limited scholarships to select players. UMD graduate Graham Harriman has played for the United States national rugby team.

Alpine skiing
UMD has produced an Alpine Ski team since the 60's. UMD Alpine Ski teams (both men and women's) compete together in the U.S. Collegiate Ski and Snowboard Association (USCSA). The USCSA comprises over 170 Colleges and Universities competing in Alpine, Snowboard, Free-style & Cross-Country Skiing (Nordic). UMD Alpine has qualified a team to the USCSA National Championships every year since 2004 (Men's, women's or both). UMD Alpine is one of 2 colleges in its division to hold that distinction out of 20 colleges.

Discontinued intercollegiate programs
UMD, at one time, also sponsored a number of other successful varsity programs such as men's tennis, men's golf, women's golf, wrestling, men's and women's swimming and diving, and men's and women's cross country skiing.

References

External links